, also known as "Kite of the Azure Flame", is a fictional character from CyberConnect2's video game series .hack. Introduced in .hack//Infection (2002), Kite is player character avatar in a fictional massively multiplayer online role-playing game (MMORPG) known as "The World". Kite's whose school-friend Yasuhiko, who uses the alias Orca, introduces Kite to The World. When Orca is killed in combat by an unknown enemy, Yasuhiko falls into a coma. Kite forms a team in The World to investigate Orca's case alongside those of other players to whom the same fate befalls after similar encounters. Kite also appears in finale of the series' anime sequel .hack//Sign and in a manga adaptation of the games. Although the teenager behind Kite leaves The World in following games, his avatar was used to create characters who appear in sequels.

Kite was created by CyberConnect2 CEO Hiroshi Matsuyama and writer Kazunori Itō, who aimed to create a character who is immersed in an MMORPG alongside the player. He was designed by artist Yoshiyuki Sadamoto, who was inspired by the manga character Naruto Uzumaki from the manga Naruto by Masashi Kishimoto. Sadamoto aimed to make Kite look like a typical teenager with an interesting outfit. Kite was voiced by Sayaka Aida by in Japanese and Mona Marshall in English; both actors took a liking to the character though Marshall lamented not playing the games.

Critical reception to Kite was positive. Critics enjoyed his role in the story and his heroic traits he displays when trying to save Orca, which players would be able to connect with him. Critics also praised the character's design and abilities. He has been popular within the franchise, ranking highly in a character popularity poll.

Creation and design

CyberConnect2 CEO Hiroshi Matsuyama considered Kite as a relatable character when making the game and wanted the next game to feature a different version of the lead character for .hack//G.U.. CyberConnect2 said Kite had become a popular character following its release. In retrospect, Matsuyama found the original Kite had little personality and wanted to try out another character. Matsuyama described Kite as an enthusiastic hero, saying the main reason he became one was the fate of his friend Yasuhiko. Writer Kazunori Itō stated the concept for .hack was mainly focused on the actions of Kite and Black Rose in The World. As a result, in later projects related with the series, the writers and developers shifted the focus onto their personal lives; the staff found the shift challenging because there were more areas to explore. 

In writing Kite, CyberConnect2 provided different takes of character to contrast him. Itō said casting the player into the role of a subscriber to The World creates a unique story-telling situation that draws the player more deeply into the plot. Kite is a friendly character so Itō wanted to write Tsukasa: a contrasting, antisocial character for the television series .hack//Sign, an anime that takes place at the same time than the games. Matsuyama described a kind character with no individuality because the player was directly controlling him. As a result, the next character for .hack was Haseo, whose antisocial personality was meant to reflect shonen manga.

While making the .hack games, character designer Yoshiyuki Sadamoto used the manga character Naruto Uzumaki as a model for Kite. Shortly afterwards, CyberConnect2 started developing the Naruto: Ultimate Ninja games although Sadamoto was unaware of this. One of the most important areas of Kite's design is Kite's hat, which Sadamoto used to make him unique. He wanted the character to look realistic, a trait Sadamoto thought when seeing Naruto. Multiple revisions were done until the artist was satisfied with the character's appearance. Sadamoto wanted Kite's design to suggest a high-school pupil was controlling the PC, so he revised the character's trousers. Matsuyama oversaw Kite's design.

Kite is voiced by Sayaka Aida in Japanese and Mona Marshall in English. Aida enjoyed the character and thanked fans of the series for supporting her. When working on the first four games, Aida was intrigued by the appeal of the .hack games since her auditions for the part of Kite. She felt Kite was not the most popular character in the franchise, and that Haseo and Endrance are more appealing heroes. Marshall enjoyed her character, stating she "had lots of levels to play" because Kite displays both a strong and weak personality depending on the situation. She was sad she could not play .hack because she had neither a console nor the time needed to play the games she worked on.

Appearances

In .hack
Kite, a Twin Blade, is the main character of the .hack// series. In .hack//Infection, Kite's friend Orca invites him to play The World, in which they encounter a girl called Aura who is being chased by a humanoid monster. Aura tries to entrust Orca with an item called the Book of Twilight but the monster attacks him, crashing The World servers. Kite's player discovers Orca's player Yasuhiko has fallen into a coma after the attack and resolves to discover the cause. Following Aura's leads, Kite defeats the various Phases and Cubia, the alternative side of the bracelet, destroying the bracelet. Aura gives Kite a new bracelet called the Dawn Bracelet. The Book of Twilight then activates, altering Kite's character data and giving him the Twilight Bracelet. He uses its Data Drain to correct the swordsman's code, allowing Balmung to kill it. This causes a viral infection that is spreading through the game.

Kite and BlackRose decide to cooperate to help the coma victims. After investigating a number of leads, they track down Skeith, the creature who put Orca into a coma. They defeat Skeith, but it transforms into a larger enemy called Cubia, from which they escape. In .hack//Mutation, Kite and BlackRose encounter system administrator Lios, who declares Kite's bracelet to be an illegal hack. Lios tries to delete Kite's character data but fails because it is being encrypted by the Book of Twilight. Another Cursed Wave monster called Magus attacks them. They defeat it and return to the Root Town, where they discover the computer virus has spread to The World main servers and into the real world.

In .hack//Quarantine, The World server becomes increasingly unstable. Meanwhile, Cubia  grows stronger and Kite's team barely fends off its latest attack. In contrast, they destroy Tarvos, the next Wave monster. Kite seeks the advice of Harald Hoerwick, the creator of the game who survives beyond death through his Artificial intelligence (AI) incarnations. Aura appears and hints that Cubia is the "shadow" of Kite's Twilight Bracelet. In their final battle, Kite recalls Aura's hint and asks BlackRose to destroy the bracelet, causing Cubia to fade away. Without the bracelet, the final Wave member Corbenik ambushes the party in Net Slum Root Town. With the aid of the spirits of the coma victims, Kite penetrates Corbenik's barrier. Aura sacrifices herself to end the battle, restoring the network to normal and reviving the coma victims.

Other appearances

Although he is not the protagonist, Kite appears in the final original video animation of Bee Train's anime .hack//Sign, in which  he returns to The World to reunite with his friends. An alternative chibi Kite skin is used in the spinoff manga and anime .hack//Legend of the Twilight by the protagonist, a young boy named Shugo. The manga .hack//4Koma features a series of omakes (extra features) in which Kite has a rivalry with Haseo regarding whom is the franchise's best protagonist.

In .hack//G.U., the new protagonist Haseo receives a message from BlackRose, indicating she and Kite meet each other offline and that she has feelings for him. In this game, an alternative PC Kite was created under the name of Azure Kite, one of three AIs that Aura created to destroy the AIDAs. In .hack//Link an AI version of Kite tasks the player Tokio and use a tower of the Akashic Records to save the Twilight Knights, a group of AI versions of characters based on characters in previous .hack games. Kite protects Tokio from Flügel's attack, resulting in Kite's PC being frozen after he asked Tokio to save them. The developers were inspired by Haseo's Xth form from .hack//G.U. to include a new design for the character.

Kite also appears as a player character in the fighting game .hack//Versus, as well as in the crossovers Project X Zone and Project X Zone 2. He also appears as a bonus character in New World.

Reception
Critical reception to Kite has been positive; Meristation liked his premise in the .hack games following the dark date regarding his friend. Siliconera praised the way the narrative makes the player connect with Kite, who becomes concerned with Orca's comatose state and both find a common goal of becoming stronger. This was noted to surpass expectations of the game and of massively multiplayer online games (MMO) games in general. GameSpy found Kite's existence as an avatar that is picked by a player interesting and called Kite's concern for Orca/Yasuhiko well-written; the reviewer felt attached to Kite when playing the game. Official U.S. PlayStation Magazine called it the game's "mind-bending premise" because Kite interacts interestingly with The World. According to RPGFan, Kite's journey does not reach a major point in the first game, making the story lacking. RPGamer stated while Kite's true form is "average" by storytelling tropes, he changes when his friends fall into comas and form a team to find clues to recover them.

Other comments focused on different aspects of Kite; IGN praised Kite's design, saying it is the visual's strongest point when compared to the environment while GameSpy had mixed opinions about Kite recruiting allies including anti-heroic Balmung, who did not approve of Kite's actions in previous titles. According to GameSpot, despite the series lacking innovation, Kite's weakened Data-Drain move would appeal to returning players. IGN, commented on Kite's Data-Drain and the way the narrative progresses in the game. RPGFan said while at first Kite's Data Drain looks appealing but it loses its aesthetics once done through in-game graphics. RPGamer called the Data Drain the most interesting move in the game for the concept behind it and the result, which the player might enjoy.

Upon their addition to the crossover game Project X Zone, GamesRadar found Kite and BlackRose fitting for the game because rather than being character archetypes, the characters are written as realistic teenagers who are skilled at gaming. Reviewing early trailers for .hack//G.U., RPGFan believed Kite would return as a non-playable character based on footage shown, although the character shown is Azure-Kite, who shares similarities with Kite's design. In the first series' popularity poll, Kite took first place with 2,458 votes. In another poll to commemoration of the .hack franchise's 10th anniversary, Kite was voted its second-most-popular character behind Haseo. In 2017, he was third, behind Endrance and Haseo.

References

Fictional swordfighters in video games
Male characters in video games
Role-playing video game characters
Science fantasy video game characters
Teenage characters in video games
Video game characters introduced in 2002